Air Republiq Airlines is an airline in the Philippines running unscheduled flights to the northern Philippines.

Earlier called Batanes Airlines, Air Republiq commenced operations in 2011 as an arm of South Phoenix Airlines to cater to the islands of Batanes, linking them to different major cities of Luzon. It uses the Piper Navajo for this purpose. Operating with an interline agreement with Cyclone Airways (an offshoot of Cyclone Flight Training School, located in Cauayan), Air Republiq flies under an air operator's certification from Cyclone Airways.

The airline runs unscheduled flights to Batanes (the northernmost part of the Philippines) and connects Basco to Laoag and Tuguegarao.

In 2013, the company acquired a BAe Jetstream 41 on a lease purchase basis, with plans to use this aircraft to connect Manila to several underserved routes in the Philippines. With the idea of connecting the islands and expanding the routes, the company decided to restructure the fleet with ATR 42-320 for better performance. The airline also planned to procure its own air operator's certificate from the CAAP by 2015, and was looking to start international flights to Taiwan and Malaysia by 2016.

Destinations
Manila
Basco
Itbayat
Tuguegarao
Coron
Cauayan
Laoag

Fleet
1 Beechcraft King Air B200
1 Cessna 172 (retired)
1 Cessna 421
1 BAe Jetstream 41
1 Piper PA-31-30 Navajo Chieftain

References

External links
Official website
Aviation Update
 Air Republiq - official Facebook page

Airlines of the Philippines
Airlines established in 2011
Companies based in Pasay
Philippine companies established in 2011